A tollhouse or toll house is a building with accommodation for a toll collector, beside a tollgate on a toll road, canal, or toll bridge.

History 
Many tollhouses were built by turnpike trusts in England, Wales and Scotland during the 18th and early 19th centuries. Those built in the early 19th century often had a distinctive bay front to give the pikeman a clear view of the road and to provide a display area for the tollboard. In 1840, according to the Turnpike Returns in Parliamentary Papers, there were over 5,000 tollhouses operating in England. These were sold off in the 1880s when the turnpikes were closed. Many were demolished but several hundred have survived for residential or other use, with distinctive features of the old tollhouses still visible.

Canal toll houses were built in very similar style to those on turnpikes. They are sited at major canal locks or at junctions. The great age of canal-building in Britain was in the 18th century, so the majority exhibit the typical features of vernacular Georgian architecture. In the English Midlands, a major area of 18th century canal development, most are of mellow red brick and hexagonal in plan, and tall enough to give the lock keeper a good view of local traffic on the canal. Being small, most have proved unsuitable for occupation, and so are often used as shops or tourist information outlets.

The manager's office in modern toll plazas in the United States is also referred to as a "toll house" even though it is not used as a residence.

Gallery

See also 

Tollkeeper's cottages in Ontario
Tholsel, from the English word tolsey
Tollbooth

References

Bibliography
Tollhouses in England:
 Haynes, R. & Slocombe, I. (2004) Wiltshire Toll Houses, publ. Hobnob Press, Salisbury.
 Kanefsky, J. (1976) Devon Tollhouses, Exeter Ind Arch. Group, University of Exeter
 Jenkinson, T, Taylor, P (2009) The Toll-houses of South Devon, Polystar Press
 Jenkinson, T, Taylor, P (2010) The Toll-houses of North Devon, Polstar Press (
 Searle, M. (1930), Turnpikes and Toll-bars, publ. Hutchinson
 Taylor, P. (2001) The Toll-houses of Cornwall, publ. The Federation of Old Cornwall Societies.
 Taylor, P  (2010) The Toll-houses of Essex, Polystar Press (
 Ward, M & A (2011) The Toll House, Medlar Press, Shropshire

External links
 British Tollhouses has photographs and maps of some surviving tollhouses in Britain
 English tollhouse database

House
House types in the United Kingdom
Transport buildings and structures
Road infrastructure